Otenzepad is a competitive muscarinic receptor antagonist that is relatively selective at the M2 receptor. It was investigated as a treatment for arrhythmia and bradycardia due to its cardioselectivity but research ceased after stage III clinical trials. The drug was originally developed by the German pharmaceutical company, Boehringer Ingelheim Pharma KG.

Pharmacodynamics
The (+)-enantiomer has 8 times greater potency at the M2 receptor than the (-)-enantiomer.

See also
Muscarinic antagonist
Antiarrhythmic agent

References

Pyridobenzodiazepines
Piperidines
Tertiary amines